Kim Gook-jin (born February 6, 1965), is a South Korean comedian and presenter. In September 2009, he became the host of MBC's Radio Star.

Filmography

Television shows

Awards and nominations
Won Producer's Choice MC Award in 2010 SBS Entertainment Awards
Nominated for Netizen Popularity Award in 2011 SBS Entertainment Awards

References

1965 births
Living people
South Korean male comedians
South Korean television presenters